Calamaria ulmeri, commonly known as Ulmer's reed snake, is a species of snake in the family Colubridae. The species is endemic to Sumatra.

Etymology
The specific name, ulmeri, is in honor of American mammalogist Frederick A. Ulmer, Jr. (1892–1974).

Geographic range
C. ulmeri is found in northern Sumatra, and is only known from two specimens.

Habitat

Description
It is brownish dorsally, and it is yellow ventrally.

Reproduction
C. ulmeri is oviparous.

References

Further reading
David P, Vogel G (1996). Snakes of Sumatra: An annotated checklist and key with natural history notes. Frankfurt am Main, Germany: Edition Chimaira. 259 pp. .
Inger RF, Marx H (1965). "The Systematics and Evolution of the Oriental Colubrid Snakes of the Genus Calamaria ". Fieldiana Zoology 49: 1–304. (Calamaria ulmeri, pp. 68–70, Figure 18).
Sackett JT (1940). "Zoological results of the George Vanderbilt Sumatran Expedition, 1936-1939. Part IV—The Reptiles". Notulae Naturae of the Academy of Natural Sciences of Philadelphia 41: 1–3. (Calamaria ulmeri, new species).

Reptiles described in 1962
Reptiles of Indonesia
Colubrids
ulmeri